Rhigus nigrosparsus is a species of weevil in the family Curculionidae. This species can be found in Brazil and Paraguay.

References 

 Universal Biological Indexer
 Global Species
 Coleoptera-neotropical

External links 
 Rhigus nigrosparsun on Pybio.org
 World Field Guide

Entiminae
Taxa named by Maximilian Perty